Ambandrika is a town and commune in Madagascar. It belongs to the district of Ambatondrazaka, which is a part of Alaotra-Mangoro Region. The population of the town was estimated to be approximately 7000 in 2001 commune census.

Only primary schooling is available. The majority 88% of the population of the commune are farmers, while an additional 3% receives their livelihood from raising livestock. The most important crop is rice, while other important products are beans, maize and tomato.  Services provide employment for 6% of the population. Additionally fishing employs 3% of the population.

The commune is crossed by the Namontana river.

References and notes 

Populated places in Alaotra-Mangoro